Eagle's Nest Hill (Russian: Орлиное Гнездо) is a hill in the Russian city of Vladivostok.

Previously called Klykova, the peak was renamed in honour of the Russian troops who fought at Mt. St Nicholas in the Shipka Pass during the Russo-Turkish war of 1878.

Geologically the Eagle's Nest is an extinct volcano, part of the Sikhote Alin range.

Eagle's Nest Hill
Eagle's Nest Hill
Geography of Vladivostok